Huang Tzu (23 March 1904 - 9 May 1938), courtesy name Jinwu, was a Chinese musician of the early 20th century.

Life
Huang was born in Chuansha, Shanghai, in the final years of the Qing Dynasty. He was a distant relative of Huang Yanpei. He was accepted into Tsinghua College in 1916 and was introduced to Western music there. After his graduation in 1924, Huang went on to study psychology in Oberlin College in Ohio, United States. In 1928, he was accepted into Yale University, where he studied Western music. In Yale, he composed the overture In Memoriam, which is the first large-scale orchestral work by a Chinese composer. In 1929, Huang returned to China and taught in the University of Shanghai, National Music College and other music schools. In 1935, he established the Shanghai Orchestra, the first all-Chinese orchestra. Some of his students, including He Luting, Ding Shande, Zhu Ying, Jiang Dingxian, Lin Sheng, Lin Shengxi and Liu Xue'an, became famous musicians later.

Huang's best known works include: Philosophical Song (天倫歌); Plum Blossoms in the Snow (踏雪尋梅), a 1933 large cantata based on Bai Juyi's poem Chang hen ge; Flower in the Mist (花非花); Lotus Song (採蓮謠); Benshi (本事). He also composed the National Flag Anthem of the Republic of China. Huang died of typhoid fever in Shanghai in 1938.

References

Chinese male composers
1904 births
1938 deaths
Republic of China musicians
Musicians from Shanghai
20th-century classical composers
Chinese classical composers
Chinese music educators
20th-century male musicians